Zaprice Castle is a castle in Zaprice, now part of the town of Kamnik, Slovenia.

The castle was first indirectly mentioned in 1306, was originally built in the 14th century by the Dienger von Apecz family. It was rebuilt in the early 16th century by Jurij Lamberg, who gave it corner oriel windows and surrounded it with a wall with two towers, and gave it a German name: Steinbüchel. The castle is subsequently remembered as a meeting place for Kamnik's Lutherans. During the 17th and 18th century the castle was rebuilt in Baroque style and enlarged into a more comfortable residential building. Today, the castle serves as a museum and a venue for cultural and educational events.

Background 

The castle has repeatedly changed owners; the last private proprietors were the Rechbachs until 1945, when it was nationalised and transformed into multi-residential building. Soon after, the castle became the museum's headquarters and it was renovated in the following years.

The castle is surrounded by a terraced park and a wall, a dairy farm at the entrance of the complex, two pavilions, a late Gothic sign, and an open-air museum of granaries from the Tuhinj Valley. There is also an archaeological site on the east side of the castle, where the foundation of an apsidal wall, a bronze fibula, and a few fragments of an ancient glass were found.

Museum collections

The Kamnik Intermunicipal Museum was opened in the castle in 1961. The castle's salon was renovated in 1997 and serves as a venue for openings, lectures, concerts, and symposia. As of 2011, the museum had five main collections: 
 Archaeology collection
 Ethnological collection
 Culture-Historical collection
 History of art collection
 History collection

Notable exhibitions in the main castle building include a display of Thonet bentwood furniture, a display about the 19th-century middle classes of Kamnik, a display of the pastoral heritage of the Big Pasture Plateau, and a lapidary collection. An object of special interest is a Baroque portative organ built by Marko Göbl and Johann Georg Eisl, both from Ljubljana, in 1743.

References

External links 

 Kamnik Intermunicipal Museum website
 Zaprice castle on Castles of Slovenia - gradovi.net
 Zaprice castle on Virtual Guide to Slovene Museums and Galleries
 Panoramas of Zaprice castle on Virtual Guide to Slovene Museums and Galleries

Castles in Upper Carniola
Kamnik